Two Weeks to Live is a six-part 2020 TV miniseries, produced for Sky UK and HBO Max starring Maisie Williams as Kim Noakes, a misfit, who has been raised in almost total isolation "living off-the-grid" in rural Scotland for most of her life by her overprotective survivalist mother, Tina (Sian Clifford).

Plot summary
Kim goes to a pub for the first time as an adventure and meets two brothers. She is naive and goes home with them where a practical joke is played on Kima fake video depicting a nuclear apocalypse and that everybody has just two weeks to live. Kim, raised to believe the end times were close, sets off to kill the man who murdered her father in front of her when she was a child.

Cast
Maisie Williams as Kim Noakes
Sian Clifford as Tina Noakes
Mawaan Rizwan as Nicky
Taheen Modak as Jay
Jason Flemyng as DI Alan Brooks
Michael Begley as Ian
Thalissa Teixeira as Thompson
Kerry Howard as Beth
Sean Knopp as Kim's dad
Sean Pertwee as Jimmy
Pooky Quesnel as Mandy

Episodes

Production 
The UK series, written by Gaby Hull and produced by Kudos, debuted on 2 September 2020. The six part series also stars Sean Knopp, Mawaan Rizwan  and Taheen Modak.

Reception
The Guardian considers that Williams "excels in her fish-out-of-water role, flitting between hapless and determined, worldly and childlike". The Independent reviewer wrote "Two Weeks To Live lets Williams flex comedy muscles while also show off her stunt fighting and stunt skills." The NME described the action drama as also genuinely funny.

References

External links
 

2020 British television series debuts
2020s British comedy-drama television series
English-language television shows
Television shows set in Scotland
Sky UK original programming
2020 British television series endings